Three Fields Entertainment Limited is a British video game development studio. It was founded in February 2014 by Alex Ward and Fiona Sperry, who had previously worked at Criterion Games, along with developer Paul Ross who had worked with them under Criterion Games.

History 

Ward and Sperry worked for Criterion Games from 2004 until they left to form Three Fields in 2014. At Criterion, they managed the team that developed, among other titles, the Burnout series (a series of racing games that placed more emphasis on using collisions to knock out other racers and other aggressive strategies rather than more technical driving).

In 2011, EA assigned the Need for Speed series to Criterion, which were based on more technical driving. Around 2013, EA opted to shift Need for Speed to Ghost Games, and later moved about 80% of the developers at Criterion permanently to Ghost Games, though Criterion still had a consulting role in development. Neither Ward or Sperry were fond of this direction nor the corporate nature under EA; Ward said "We wanted to get back to having fun making games...This is the game business, not the work business." In November 2013, Ward, Sperry, and Paul Ross, one of the developers for Criterion, decided to leave the studio to start anew, though had to wait out for their contracts to expire, in January 2014, before starting any new venture.

The new studio, Three Fields Entertainment, was announced in March 2014. The name was based on the fact that all three founders had skill sets in the same three fields related to game development:  design, art and engineering. Several other former Criterion Games developers joined the studio since its founding.

One of their overarching goals for the studio was to develop a spiritual sequel to the Burnout series, specifically focusing on the "Crash" mode, in which players would drive vehicles at high speeds into masses of other vehicles to do as much damage as possible. Their first game, Dangerous Golf, announced in January 2016 and released in June 2016, served as a stepping stone for the studio towards this goal; similar to the "Crash" mode, the player would hit a golf ball in an enclosed space to do as much damage as possible. The title aided the studio in learning the Unreal Engine, with support from Epic Games' nearby Guildford studio, and incorporate middleware physics engines to make the destruction realistic. Dangerous Golf had lukewarm reception and sales. Co-founder Paul Ross had already left and founded Stellar Entertainment, a Guildford-based developer with former Criterion staff.

Their second title was Lethal VR, a virtual reality title that simulated shooting ranges and light gun-based arcade games like Point Blank and Time Crisis. The title was released in December 2016.

Three Fields' third game is Danger Zone, which aimed to achieve the vision of the "Crash" mode spiritual successor. It builds atop the knowledge they had from Dangerous Golf to recreate the "Crash" mode for modern computer and console systems. Danger Zone was announced in April 2017 and released in May 2017. Danger Zone also received lukewarm reception and disappointing sales.

The following year, the studio announced its sequel Danger Zone 2, which adds in more driving segments along routes inspired by real-world highways, for anticipated release in July 2018. Alongside this, Three Fields revealed Dangerous Driving, a closed-course racing game that includes the various crashing elements from these previous titles and more in line with the Burnout series, with a planned release on 9 April 2019.

The studio announced its sequel Dangerous Driving 2 to be released in late 2020. it is expected to be an open world game, similar in nature to Burnout Paradise, with players able to race against computer or online opponents. In August 2022, a trailer for the studio's next game, Wreckreation, was released on YouTube. Published by THQ Nordic, the game will be an open world arcade racer with Burnout-style gameplay and an emphasis on customisation. The developer confirmed via a retweet through their official Twitter account that Wreckreation is the new title for the previously announced Dangerous Driving 2.

Games developed 
 Dangerous Golf, 2016 (Microsoft Windows, PlayStation 4, Xbox One)
 Lethal VR, 2016 (Microsoft Windows, PlayStation 4)
 Danger Zone, 2017 (Microsoft Windows, PlayStation 4, Xbox One)
 Danger Zone 2, 2018 (Microsoft Windows, PlayStation 4, Xbox One)
 Dangerous Driving, 2019 (Microsoft Windows, PlayStation 4, Xbox One)
 Wreckreation, 2023 (Microsoft Windows, PlayStation 4/5, Xbox One/Series X/S)

References

External links
 

2014 establishments in England
British companies established in 2014
Video game companies of the United Kingdom
Video game companies established in 2014
Video game development companies
Petersfield
Companies based in Hampshire
Privately held companies of England